John Shafto (c. 1693 – 1742), of Whitworth Hall, County Durham, was a British lawyer and Tory politician who sat in the House of Commons from 1730 to 1742.

Shafto was the second son  of Mark Shafto of Whitworth and his wife Margaret Ingleby, daughter of Sir John Ingleby, 2nd Baronet of Ripley, Yorkshire. He matriculated at  Lincoln College, Oxford on  9 May 1710, aged 16. He was admitted at Lincolns Inn on 22 December 1711  and was called to the bar in 1718. In 1719, he succeeded his brother Robert Shafto to the family seat at Whitworth. He married Mary Jackson, daughter of Thomas Jackson of Nunnington, Yorkshire on 20 May 1731.

Shafto was returned as  Tory Member of Parliament for City of Durham in succession to his brother  at a closely contested by-election on 26 January 1730. He was returned unopposed at the 1734 British general election  and again at the  1741 British general election. He voted against the Government in all known occasions.

Shafto died on 3 April 1742 leaving two sons and two daughters, and was buried at St Andrews Churchyard, Holborn. He was succeeded by his son Robert (Bobby Shafto).

References

External links
Rowntree Tryon Galleries - John Shafto of Bavington Hall and Whitworth Hall, Northumberland, holding a hunter, in a landscape, with a groom and stable beyond

1690s births
1742 deaths
Members of the Parliament of Great Britain for English constituencies
British MPs 1727–1734
British MPs 1734–1741
British MPs 1741–1747